Galileo Bonaiuti (Florence, circa 1370–1450) was an Italian doctor and member of the Florentine governing council, successful in his time but most noteworthy as the ancestor from whom Galileo Galilei got both his given and family names.

Biography
Bonaiuti practiced medicine in Florence in the 15th century, taught medicine at the University of Florence, and was on the governing council of the Republic of Florence, a powerful position on a par (domestically) with being a member of the US senate, today.  He was buried in the Basilica of Santa Croce, roughly halfway between where Michelangelo and his own descendant, Galileo, would be interred.

While officially retaining the Bounaiuti surname for generations, the family began referring to itself by the surnames Galilei or Galileo in his honor around the time he was alive. This is the likely source of his descendant's own name, influenced by the inscription on his tomb in the Basilica; Galileo Bonaiuti was referred to as:

 Magister Galileus de Galileis, olim Bonaiutis.

which means: Professor Galileo of Galilei, of the Bonaiuti family.

References

14th-century people of the Republic of Florence
15th-century people of the Republic of Florence
1370 births
1450 deaths